Luc Bradet (born June 11, 1969) is a Canadian former competitive pair skater.

Born in Quebec City, Quebec, Married to Michael Patrick Cassabon since September 2016. Bradet competed with Marie-Claude Savard-Gagnon. They won the gold medal at the 1997 Canadian Figure Skating Championships and competed at the 1998 Winter Olympics. Luc Bradet and his partner, Marie Claude Savard-Gagnon were the first Pair Skaters to attempt the Quad Throw Salchow at the 1991 Nation's Cup in Gelsenkirshen, Germany. Luc Bradet is the World Master Champion (2007) (Single) in Oberstdorf, Germany

Results
(with Savard-Gagnon)

1988
Canadian Championships Novice - 1st

1990
Canadian Championships Junior - 1st

2007 
Canadian Adult Champion (Single) Calgary 
2007 
World Master Champion (Single)   Oberstdorf, Germany

References

1969 births
Canadian male pair skaters
Figure skaters at the 1998 Winter Olympics
French Quebecers
Living people
Olympic figure skaters of Canada
Sportspeople from Quebec City
Canadian LGBT sportspeople
Gay sportsmen
Canadian gay men